The UNU Akino Memorial Research Fellowship is awarded for studies in the fields of human security and sustainable development in Central Asia and neighboring regions.

The fellowship links the UNU-Akino Memorial Research Project on Central Asia and neighboring regions where Akino had an academic and professional interest. On an exceptional basis, fellowships can be awarded to nationals of Central Asian countries who study at a Japanese university.

In 1999 the UNU received a ¥100 million donation from the Japanese government in memory of Akino. Half of the donation is being used to fund the five-year Akino Memorial Research Project.

See also

 List of environmental awards

Notes

External links
Akino internship grants
 -- Dr. Yutaka Akino (1950-1998) 
 AkinoMemorial.com

Fellowships
Science and technology in Japan
Environmental sciences awards
Grants (money)